Guangzhou Xiaopeng Motors Technology Co Ltd, doing business as XPeng Motors, commonly known as XPeng, is a Chinese electric vehicle manufacturer. The company is headquartered in Guangzhou, Guangdong, with offices in Mountain View, California, United States and is publicly traded on the New York Stock Exchange.

History

XPeng was co-founded in 2014 by Xia Heng (Henry Xia) and He Tao, former senior executives at GAC Group with expertise in automotive technology and research and development. Initial backers included: the founder of UCWeb and former Alibaba executive He Xiaopeng, namesake and current Chairman of XPeng, and Lei Jun, the founder of Xiaomi. Prominent Chinese and international investors included Alibaba, Foxconn and IDG Capital. A further funding round in 2018 saw Alibaba's vice president Joseph Tsai join the corporate board of XPeng.

XPeng's subsidiary in the United States, XMotors.ai held a permit for testing self-driving cars from the California Department of Motor Vehicles starting in September 2018. The permit was revoked in February 2020 due to XPeng's failure to submit a disengagement report. XPeng Motors then received a renewed Autonomous Vehicles Testing Permit from the California Department of Motor Vehicles in March 2020.

XPeng started production of its first model, the XPeng G3 SUV, in November 2018. It launched the G3 in December 2018 at the 2018 Consumer Electronics Show in Las Vegas.

Its second model, the P7, a four-door electric sedan, premiered in April 2019 at the 2019 Auto Shanghai show and started deliveries to customers in June 2020.

In May 2019, XPeng launched a vehicle for hire company with its own vehicles to serve Guangzhou.

In November 2019, XPeng raised US$400 million in a third fundraising round, which saw Xiaomi join as a strategic investor of XPeng. In July 2020, XPeng raised US$500 million from a group of investors including Aspex, Coatue, Hillhouse Capital and Sequoia Capital China. In August 2020, XPeng raised an additional US$400 million from a group of investors including Alibaba, Qatar Investment Authority and Abu Dhabi's sovereign wealth fund Mubadala. On 27 August 2020, XPeng raised US$1.5 billion with an IPO on the New York Stock Exchange, where its shares climbed more than 40% on the first day of trading. In March 2021, the company received a US$76.9 million funding from Guangdong Yuecai Investment Holdings Co. As of May 2021, 23% of XPeng shares are owned by He Xiaopeng, and 12% by Alibaba Group.

In the third quarter of 2021, revenue for XPeng rose over 500% compared to the year before. It had also increased its R&D team by about a third since the year before.

In 2021, for the first time, XPeng started exporting its flagship P7 sedan. Its first international market was Norway, starting in August. In August 2021, the company's P5 subcompact sedan became able to read traffic lights. In September 2021, XPeng brought its P5 to market. It is the first production car to be equipped with lidar sensors for advanced driver-assistance systems (ADAS).

In October 2021, XPeng's subsidiary HT Aero announced $500 million in funding and the design for a flying car with a planned launch in 2024.

Technology

Autonomous driving (XPILOT)
XPeng uses a combination of lidar, radar, and a camera for driver aid. The lidar system uses laser light to create a 3D space by measuring the distance between objects and the time it takes for the light to bounce back. Xinzhou Wu stated "Lidar will provide the 3D drivable space and precise depth estimation to small moving obstacles even like kids and pets, and obviously, other pedestrians and the motorbikes which are a nightmare for anybody who's working on driving", The radar will provide the vehicles with the ability to detect the speed of an object and also the location. The camera will provide the vehicle with basic semantic information as stated by Xinzhou Wu. Lidar has come down in price significantly over the last few years with drone companies such as DJI announcing the integration in their aerial surveying technology. The Zenmuse L1 - Lidar + RGB camera starts at a price of $13,100. XPeng's lidar system is provided by Livox. The decreasing price and increased innovation and development in lidar is making it cheaper for consumers to enjoy. "Our next vehicle is targeting the economy class. I would say it's mid-range in terms of price".

Battery 
XPeng's batteries are developed by China's largest battery developer, Contemporary Amperex Technology (CATL).

XPeng has moved away from CTP batteries to LFP batteries, which negates the need for cobalt in a battery, one of the most expensive materials in a battery. However LFP batteries do reduce the range of the vehicle. "Xpeng announces they were launching new versions of the P7 sedan and G3 SUV with LFP batteries. The new versions with lithium iron phosphate cells will be available for the rear-wheel-drive P7 sports sedan first, effectively driving down the 700 km long-range to 480 kilometres." LFP batteries however do provide longer life cycles and are generally safer.

Charging network, fast charging stations 

XPeng offers free lifetime charging similar to what Tesla has offered their customers around the world. XPeng's charging network has expanded to over 1,000 charging stations within China, and customers have access to another 200,000 third party stations positioned in major cities. XPeng intends to construct more than 50 S4 sites in large cities by the end of 2022, with an additional 20 sites each in Beijing, Shanghai, and Guangzhou, with Shenzhen following in 2023. By 2025, Xpeng hopes to have 2,000 super-fast charging stations.

Production 
XPeng has two factories, one in Zhaoqing and the other being built in Guangzhou. The Zhaoqing factory has an annual production capacity of 100,000 vehicles. XPeng has only sold 50,000 vehicles since its first offering. The new Guangzhou factories construction was started in September 2020. Annual production of the Guangzhou factory has yet to be started but XPeng staff has said "XPeng's new Smart EV Manufacturing Base in Guangzhou will significantly expand the Company's production capacity and accelerate XPeng's momentum to achieve its goals in innovation, technological advancement and growth." A third factory has also been acquired, this factory will reside in Wuhan which will produce another 100,000 vehicles annually. The factories construction has not been started but has support from the government of Wuhan. The factory is stated to be an important location for XPeng as it will enhance XPeng's distribution. Chairman and CEO He said "Wuhan's strategic location as an auto manufacturing and distribution hub will further enhance our supply chain management, sales and distribution network in the future."

Markets

China 
China is the largest market for automotive sales accounting for 30% of the worlds vehicle sales in 2020. Between 2009 and 2012, China identified the electric EV market as the quickest and easiest way for entering the auto industry market. Between 2009 and 2016, the Chinese Central Government has spent an estimated 12.6 billion yuan or (1.9 billion) on subsidies for new energy vehicles.

Between 2013 and 2017, China witnessed the worst air pollution it has ever seen. China initiated a very effective policy of cutting its vehicle registration lottery from 250,000 to 150,000 and allotting 20,000 of those slots to new energy vehicles. This stimulated the electric vehicle market of China and pushed people to look into new energy vehicles over fossil fuel vehicles. In 2015, Beijing issued a red alert on air quality and required conventional vehicles to operate on alternating days whilst electric and new energy vehicles could operate every day. China's EV market exploded from 18,000 vehicles in 2013 to 330,000 vehicles sold in China in 2015. In 2018, more than 1 million electric vehicles were produced in China.

The global auto industry has witnessed growth from Chinese start ups like XPeng, NIO and Li in the local Chinese market for EVs. The global auto industry is now witnessing and experiencing competition with these non-state owned Chinese startups. China has gained an increase in desire for SUVs. While XPeng, NIO and Li fall behind in subcompact and small cars to foreign brands like Tesla and Mercedes, domestic brands now account for 56% of the electric SUV market. XPeng's sales have gone from 630 EV sales in January 2020 to 6,015 EV sales in January 2021.

Europe 
Europe is currently the second largest EV market accounting for 28% of the global market. China's EV exports lag behind that of the US and Europe's EV companies. In late December 2020, XPeng stated it would be delivering the G3 SUV to Norway. "Our launch in Europe comes just as consumers are shifting in increasingly large numbers to more sustainable personal transport, and at a tipping point where governments around the world are stepping up their zero-emission efforts", said He. XPeng has also decided that it would be selling its P7 EV sedan to the European market this year.

As of 2021, XPeng has sold 211 G3 SUVs in Norway. XPeng stated it will be tough to break into the European auto market but with policies in Europe further encouraging the purchase of EV cars, XPeng will seek to find those consumers. Without infrastructure to build XPeng vehicles, it will also add to the challenge of breaking into the European auto market.

Hong Kong 
On 7 July 2021, XPeng debuted on the Hong Kong Stock Exchange. The choice to bring the company to the exchange before a second listing could result in the company taking a better position in the city's share indexes. As a dual-primary listing, XPeng will be eligible for Stock Connect, an investment channel facilitating trade between Hong Kong and mainland China. With its listing in Hong Kong, XPeng became the first US-listed Chinese firm with dual primary listing. The move will as well provide some security for the company in the event of being kicked off the US market.

Models

Sales

Controversies

Apple IP theft 
In July 2018, the United States Department of Justice charged an ex-Apple employee for stealing the trade secrets of Apple's autonomous car project in an attempt to get a job at XPeng. In August 2022, the former Apple engineer, Xiaolang Zhang, pleaded guilty to trade secret theft in federal court.

Tesla IP theft 
In March 2019, Tesla sued Cao Guangzhi, a former Tesla employee, accusing him of stealing its Autopilot source code and bringing them to XPeng. Cao rejected the accusation of IP theft, but later said he had uploaded Tesla's source code to his iCloud prior to leaving Tesla. In response to Tesla's accusations, XPeng launched an internal investigation. In November 2020, XPeng provided a copy of its source code to a neutral third party to compare to Tesla's to prove nothing was copied. Neither XPeng or any subsidiaries were parties to Tesla's original lawsuit. A court-appointed neutral third party concluded XPeng's code did not use Tesla's IP after comparing both source codes as provided by the companies. Tesla and Cao moved to settle soon after this was established.

Facial recognition data theft 
In December 2021, XPeng was fined for the illegal collection of the facial data of 430,000 visitors of its stores. The fine was 100,000 yuan ($15,716).

See also 
 New energy vehicles in China

References

External links 

 
2020 initial public offerings
Battery electric vehicle manufacturers
Car brands
Car manufacturers of China
Chinese companies established in 2014
Companies listed on the New York Stock Exchange
Electric vehicle manufacturers of China
Manufacturing companies based in Guangzhou
Multinational companies headquartered in China
Vehicle manufacturing companies established in 2014